The discography of Black Flag, an American hardcore punk band, consists of seven studio albums, three live albums, four compilation albums, eight EPs, and one single.

Studio albums

Live albums

Compilation albums

Extended plays

Singles

Digital Singles 
3 digital singles were released from May to July to support the then-upcoming album What The..., releasing on 5 November 2013.

Video albums

Films

Music videos

Other appearances 
The following Black Flag tracks were released on compilation albums and soundtracks. This is not an exhaustive list; tracks that were first released on the band's albums, EPs, or singles are not included.

I Denotes tracks that were re-released on The First Four Years.

References

Punk rock group discographies
Discography
Discographies of American artists